New York's 3rd congressional district is a congressional district for the United States House of Representatives in the State of New York. It is represented by Republican George Santos, who was elected to represent the district in 2022. It was one of 18 districts that voted for Joe Biden in the 2020 presidential election while being won or held by a Republican in 2022.

The district includes part of the North Shore of Long Island. It expands across northern Nassau County and into far northeastern Queens. Long Island communities in the district include Oyster Bay Cove, Old Brookville, Levittown, Glen Cove, Roslyn, Manhasset, Plainview, Bethpage, Port Washington, Hicksville, Jericho, Syosset, Mineola, Farmingdale, Massapequa Park, and Great Neck. Queens neighborhoods in the district include Little Neck, Whitestone, Glen Oaks, Floral Park, and Queens Village.

NY-03 is the wealthiest congressional district in New York, and in 2022, was the fourth-wealthiest nationally.

Recent statewide election results

History

This district historically has been centered in northeast Nassau County, but has added other areas from time to time. In the 1960s the district encompassed the northern half of Nassau County and a small corner of Queens. In the 1970s North Hempstead town was added to the 6th District and the 3rd moved into Huntington in Suffolk County and parts of southeast Nassau County. In the 1980s most of eastern Nassau was added to the 4th District, and the 3rd was composed of northwest Nassau, a narrow corridor along the Long Island Sound, and northwest Suffolk. After the 1992 redistricting the North Shore was transferred to the new 5th District and the 3rd consisted of inland areas of northern and eastern Nassau County, and the Nassau County south shore. An even narrower corridor linked the northwest Nassau and northwest Suffolk portion of the 5th District, leaving most of Oyster Bay in the 3rd. The 2002 remap removed some areas of eastern Nassau but added south shore towns in Suffolk County and the shore areas of northeast Nassau. In 2012, the district moved from the South Shore to the North Shore and re-entered Queens for the first time since the 1960s.

List of members representing the district

1789–1805: one seat

1805–1809: Two seats on general ticket with 2nd district

Gurdon S. Mumford is usually listed as member from the 2nd district, and George Clinton Jr. from the 3rd district, because Clinton was elected to fill the vacancy caused by the election of Mitchill to the U.S. Senate, and Mitchill had been elected previously in the 3rd district. However, in 1804 Mitchill was already re-elected on the 2nd/3rd general ticket, and both Clinton and Mumford were elected in special elections, receiving votes in both districts.

The districts were separated in 1809.

1809–1823: one seat

1823–1843: three, then four, seats
Starting in 1823, three seats were elected at-large district-wide on a general ticket. In 1833, a fourth seat was apportioned to the district, also elected district-wide at-large on the same general ticket.

1843–present

Recent election results
In New York State there are numerous parties at various points on the political spectrum. Certain parties will invariably endorse either the Republican or Democratic candidate for every office, hence the state electoral results contain both the party votes, and the final candidate votes (Listed as "Recap").

See also

 List of United States congressional districts
 New York's congressional districts
 United States congressional delegations from New York

References

 
 
 Congressional Biographical Directory of the United States 1774–present
 National atlas congressional maps

1789 establishments in New York (state)
Constituencies established in 1789
03
Nassau County, New York
Suffolk County, New York